Orthetrum caledonicum, the blue skimmer, is a common Australian dragonfly in the family Libellulidae.

Males have a powder blue thorax and abdomen pruinescent blue when mature. The females are brownish grey in colour while the teneral are yellow with black markings. They are medium in size, with a body length of 4.5 cm (2 in) and a wingspan of 7 cm (3 in).

The species is widespread throughout mainland Australia and extending to Tasmania. It is also found in New Guinea, New Caledonia, Loyalty Islands and Lesser Sunda Islands. It inhabits a range of still and flowing water habitats including temporary waters.

Gallery

References

External links

Brisbane Insects and Spiders
CSIRO fact file

Libellulidae
Odonata of Oceania
Odonata of Australia
Taxa named by Friedrich Moritz Brauer
Insects described in 1865